Electric Rodeo is the second studio album by Shooter Jennings, released in 2006 on the Universal South label. It was recorded between January and October 2005 in various studios in and around Los Angeles, California, and Nashville, Tennessee.

Composition 

Electric Rodeo was recorded before Put the "O" Back in Country, but released as Jennings' second album. 

The music of Electric Rodeo encompasses Southern rock, hard rock, arena rock, blues, blues rock, country rock, heavy metal, rock and roll, swamp rock and Texas blues.

Track listing

Personnel
Shooter Jennings - guitar, lead vocals, backing vocals, Hammond organ, harmonica, piano, Wurlitzer
Leroy Powell - guitar, backing vocals, slide guitar
Ted Russell Kamp - bass guitar, backing vocals
Bryan Keeling - drums, percussion
Robby Turner - pedal steel guitar
Bonnie Bramlett - backing vocals
Gary Murray - fiddle
Technical
Dave Cobb - producer
Mark Rains - mixer
James Minchin III - photographer

Chart performance

References

2006 albums
Shooter Jennings albums
Hard rock albums by American artists
Show Dog-Universal Music albums
Albums produced by Dave Cobb